A by-election was held for the New South Wales Legislative Assembly electorate of Byron on 17 February 1973 because of the resignation of Stanley Stephens.

Dates

Result

Stanley Stephens resigned.

See also
Electoral results for the district of Byron
List of New South Wales state by-elections

References

1973 elections in Australia
New South Wales state by-elections
1970s in New South Wales
February 1973 events in Australia